The Climb is a Canadian-British co-produced adventure drama film, directed by Donald Shebib and released in 1986. A dramatization of mountaineer Hermann Buhl's 1953 attempt to climb Nanga Parbat, the film stars Bruce Greenwood as Buhl alongside James Hurdle, Kenneth Welsh, Ken Pogue, Thomas Hauff, Guy Bannerman, David James Elliott and Tom Butler as members of his expedition.

The film was broadcast on British television in 1986 as part of Mountain Men, a series of three films dramatizing noteworthy historical climbing expeditions. In Canada, it was announced as screening in the Perspectives Canada program at both the 1986 Toronto International Film Festival and the 1987 Toronto International Film Festival, although it is not clear from currently available sources whether this is because the film actually screened in both years, or because the 1986 screening was cancelled and rescheduled for 1987. The film then received limited theatrical release in Canada and the United States in fall 1987.

The film received two Genie Award nominations at the 9th Genie Awards in 1988, for Best Cinematography (Richard Leiterman) and Best Sound Editing (Robin Leigh, Richard Cadger, Jane Tattersall, Penny Hozy and Peter McBurnie). Leiterman received the Canadian Society of Cinematographers Feature Award for the film in 1988.

References

External links
 

1986 films
British adventure films
Canadian adventure drama films
English-language Canadian films
Films directed by Donald Shebib
Mountaineering films
1980s English-language films
1980s Canadian films
1980s British films